Individual jumping equestrian at the 2013 Southeast Asian Games was held in Wunna Theikdi Equestrian Field, Naypyidaw, Myanmar on December 18, 2013.

Schedule
All times are Myanmar Standard Time (UTC+06:30)

Results
Legend
RT — Retired
EL — Eliminated
WD — Withdrawn
NS — Not Started
Pen — Penalties

Qualifier

Final

References

Equestrian at the 2013 Southeast Asian Games